Madascincus arenicola is an extant species of skink, a lizard in the family Scincidae. The species is endemic to Madagascar.

Geographic range
M. arenicola is found in the Ampombofofo and Forêt d'Orangea regions of Antsiranana Province, in northern Madagascar.

Habitat

References

Madascincus
Reptiles described in 2011
Reptiles of Madagascar
Endemic fauna of Madagascar